is a Japanese voice actor from Saitama Prefecture. He is currently affiliated with Mausu Promotion.

Early life
Tamaru was born in Hokkaido, and raised in Saitama Prefecture.

During high school, he listened to a program on the radio while studying for university entrance exams, and became interested in the anime song that was playing there. This prompted him to become a voice actor.

When Tamaru was in his second year at college, he saw an advertisement in a magazine and started attending a voice actor training school.

Career 
In 2007, he passed the 2nd Sigma Seven Public Audition with Asuka Ōgame, Asuka Nishi and Mai Fuchigami.

In 2009, he made his TV animation debut in Kupū!! Mamegoma! as Sasaki-san.

In April 2015, Tamaru began broadcasting A & G + "Beloved Memories", a personality with voice actor Yuma Uchida.

In April 2020, he announced that he would transfer to Mausu Promotion.

Filmography

Television animation
2009
Kupū!! Mamegoma!, Sasaki-san

2010
Squid Girl, Papa

2011
Happy Kappy, Kapibara

2012
Jewelpet Sunshine, Shiraishi Mikage / Granite
Code:Breaker, Aoyama
Jewelpet Kira☆Deco!, Granite
La storia della Arcana Famiglia, Orso
Muv-Luv Alternative: Total Eclipse, Creshowa Kontarsky
Robotics;Notes, Takahashi, Tres Beau 3
Sket Dance, Uehara

2013
Meganebu!, Takuma Hachimine
Samurai Flamenco, Ana Oda
Silver Spoon, Kouji Futamata
Tamako Market, Mochizō Ōji
Tanken Driland: Sennen no Mahō, Chinpira

2014
Aikatsu!, Tsubasa Sena
Haikyū!!, Akira Kunimi
Invaders of the Rokujyōma!?, Ken'ichi
Jewelpet Happiness, Granite
Silver Spoon 2, Kouji Futamata, Manabu Yoda
Sword Art Online II, Talken
The Irregular at Magic High School, Mikihiko Yoshida
Yama no Susume Second Season, Ken'ichi's friend

2015
Chaos Dragon, Hakuei
Go! Princess Precure, Shuu Imagawa
Lady Jewelpet, Granite
Syomin Sample, Kimito Kagurazaka
The Asterisk War, Ayato Amagiri
World Break: Aria of Curse for a Holy Swordsman, Eiji
Jewelpet: Magical Change, Granite

2016
Boku Dake ga Inai Machi, Hiromi Sugita (adult)
The Asterisk War 2nd Season, Ayato Amagiri
Hitori no Shita the outcast, Chō Soran
Touken Ranbu: Hanamaru, Ichigo Hitofuri

2017
Seiren, Shōichi Kamita
Tsuki ga Kirei, Takumi Hira

2018
Gundam Build Divers, Koichi Nanase
Kakuriyo no Yadomeshi, Byakuya
Mitsuboshi Colors, Saitou
Touken Ranbu: Hanamaru 2, Ichigo Hitofuri
Darling in the Franxx, 9'ε

2019
Kochoki: Wakaki Nobunaga, Sakuma Morishige

2020
A3! Season Autumn & Winter, Tsumugi Tsukioka
The Irregular at Magic High School: Visitor Arc, Mikihiko Yoshida
Talentless Nana, Tsunekichi Hatadaira

2021
I-Chu: Halfway Through the Idol, Akio Tobikura
Remake Our Life!, Takashi Kiryū
Seirei Gensouki: Spirit Chronicles, Charles Arbor
The Vampire Dies in No Time, Shot
Build Divide -#00000 (Code Black)-, Naomitsu Enjō
The Faraway Paladin, Ethelbald
Restaurant to Another World 2, Shareef
86 -Eighty Six-, Eugene Rantz

2022
Requiem of the Rose King, Thomas Grey, Marquess of Dorset
Build Divide -#00000 (Code White)-, Naomitsu Enjō

2023
Giant Beasts of Ars, Mezami
Reborn to Master the Blade: From Hero-King to Extraordinary Squire, Rafael Billford
Reign of the Seven Spellblades, Oliver Horn

Theatrical animation
Towa no Quon (2011), Operator 9, Young Man A
Star Driver The Movie (2013), Bairotto
Aikatsu! The Movie (2014), Tsubasa Sena
Tamako Love Story (2014), Mochizō Ōji
The Irregular at Magic High School: The Movie – The Girl Who Summons the Stars (2017), Mikihiko Yoshida
Shirobako: The Movie (2020), Kyūji Takahashi

Tokusatsu
Kamen Rider × Kamen Rider Wizard & Fourze: Movie War Ultimatum – Other Kamen Riders (Voice of Hideki Tasaka and Junji Majima)

Video games
Yomecolle (2013), Takuma Hachimine
12-Sai. Honto no Kimochi (2014), Inaba Mikami
Gakuen Heaven 2: Double Scramble (2014), Yuki Asahina
Haikyū!! Tsunage! Itadaki no Keshiki!! (2014), Akira Kunimi
Nyan Love: Watashi no Koi no Mitsukekata (2014), Kōhei Natsume
The Irregular at Magic High School Lost Zero (2014), Mikihiko Yoshida
The Irregular at Magic High School Out of Order (2014), Mikihiko Yoshida
100 Sleeping Princes and the Kingdom of Dreams (2015), Caliburn
Boku to Sekai no Euclid (2015), Nayuta Tachibana
I-Chu (2015), Akio Tobikura
Touken Ranbu (2015), Ichigo Hitofuri
\Komepuri/ (2016), Maki Yō
Gakuen Toshi Asterisk Hōka Kenran (2016), Ayato Amagiri
Utawarerumono Futari no Hakuoro (2016), Yashimu
A3! Otome Anime Game (2017), Tsukioka Tsumugi
King's Raid (2018), Lucias
DANKIRA!!! - Boys, be DANCING! (2019), Tsubaki Kento
Promise of Wizard (2019), Arthur
Disney: Twisted-Wonderland (2020), Azul Ashengrotto
Touken Ranbu Warriors (2022), Ichigo Hitofuri
AI: The Somnium Files – nirvanA Initiative (2022), Ryuki
Devil Butler with Black Cat (2022), Berrien Cliane
The Legend of Heroes: Kuro no Kiseki II – Crimson Sin (2022), Garden-Master

References

External links
 Official agency profile 
 

1986 births
Living people
Japanese male video game actors
Japanese male voice actors
Male voice actors from Saitama Prefecture
21st-century Japanese male actors